Evan King and Hunter Reese were the defending champions but chose not to defend their title.

Sekou Bangoura and Michael Mmoh won the title after defeating Treat Huey and John-Patrick Smith 4–6, 6–4, [10–8] in the final.

Seeds

Draw

References

External links
 Main draw

Cary Challenger - Doubles
2019 Doubles